Sar Tang (also known as Sar Tang-e Maḩmūd) is a village in Dinaran Rural District, in the Central District of Ardal County, Chaharmahal and Bakhtiari Province, Iran. At the 2006 census, its population was 64, in 10 families.

References 

Populated places in Ardal County